Alexis Leger (31 May 1887 – 20 September 1975), better known by his pseudonym Saint-John Perse (also Saint-Leger Leger), was a French poet-diplomat, awarded the Nobel Prize in Literature in 1960 "for the soaring flight and evocative imagery of his poetry." He was a major French diplomat from 1914 to 1940, after which he lived primarily in the United States until 1967.

Early life 
Alexis Leger was born in Pointe-à-Pitre, Guadeloupe. His great-grandfather, a solicitor, had settled in Guadeloupe in 1815. His grandfather and father were also solicitors; his father was also a member of the city council. The Leger family owned two plantations, one of coffee (La Joséphine) and the other of sugar (Bois-Debout). St. Léger described his childhood on Guadeloupe as "the son of a family French as only the colonials are French". 

In 1897, Hégésippe Légitimus, the first native Guadeloupan elected president of the Guadeloupe General Council, took office with a vindictive agenda towards colonists. The Leger family returned to metropolitan France in 1899 and settled in Pau. The young Alexis felt like an expatriate and spent much of his time hiking, fencing, riding horses and sailing in the Atlantic. He enrolled at Lycée Louis-Barthou and passed the baccalauréat with honours and began studying law at the University of Bordeaux. When his father died in 1907, the resulting strain on his family's finances led Leger to temporarily interrupt his studies, but he eventually completed his degree in 1910.

In 1904, he met the poet Francis Jammes at Orthez, who became a close friend. He frequented cultural clubs, and met Paul Claudel, Odilon Redon, Valery Larbaud and André Gide. He wrote short poems inspired by the story of Robinson Crusoe (Images à Crusoe) and undertook a translation of Pindar. He published his first book of poetry, Éloges, in 1911.

Diplomatic service

In China
In 1914, he joined the French diplomatic service, and spent some of his first years in Spain, Germany and the United Kingdom. When World War I broke out, he was a press corps attaché for the government. From 1916 to 1921, he was secretary to the French embassy in Peking. He probably had a secret relationship with Madame Dan Pao Tchao (née Nellie Yu Roung Ling), although according to the latter, he was just using her for obtaining information from Peking high society. During his time in Beijing, he lived in a former Taoist temple and "sat with the philosophers and sages" as he phrased it. During his time in China, he took trips across the Gobi desert and out to France's Pacific island colonies. St. Léger was fascinated by the Gobi desert, writing to a friend in France that these "desert expanses have exerted a hold on my thoughts, a fascination which approaches hallucination". The American poet Archibald MacLeish wrote that in China St. Léger "learned the art by which a man defends his life from others and even himself".

Poet in Paris
In 1921 in Washington, DC, while taking part in a world disarmament conference, he was noticed by Aristide Briand, Prime Minister of France, who recruited him as his assistant. In Paris, he got to know the fellow intellectual poet Larbaud, who used his influence to get the poem  published, written during Leger's stay in China. Leger was warm to classical music and knew Igor Stravinsky, Nadia Boulanger, and Les Six. In Parisian intellectual and artistic circles, St. Léger was considered to be rising poet, and he maintained a close friendship with Marcel Proust, whose work he in turn much admired.  

While in China, Leger had written his first extended poem Anabase, publishing it in 1924 under the pseudonym "Saint-John Perse", which he employed for the rest of his life. He then published nothing for two decades, not even a re-edition of his debut book, as he believed it inappropriate for a diplomat to publish fiction. In 1925, he became the chef de cabinet to Briand. St. Léger wrote that Briand had "the boldness of the dream...tempered...by the dictates of common sense" while having the ability to think quickly with the "indifference to the exploitation of success". St. Léger wrote that Briand "had no need of duplicity or violence to win...He hated equally stupidity, cowardice, clumsiness and vulgarity...He hunted with the lightest arms and fished with the finest lines...He brought the refinement of the artist".

The Secretary-General of the Quai d'Orsay
After Briand's death in 1932, Leger served as the General Secretary (number one civil servant) of the French Foreign Office (Quai d'Orsay) until 1940. St. Léger was a protégé of Philippe Berthelot, the long-time Secretary-General all through the 1920s, and Berthelot was forced to retire in the spring of 1932 due to ill health, St. Léger was his chosen successor. Like Briand and Berthelot, St. Léger was in the words of the French historian Marguerite Bastid-Bruguiere a strong believe in international "law and justice" to be enforced by the League of Nations, which he saw as a forum where various international problems could be resolved peacefully via negotiation. Like his mentor Berthelot who also lived in China, St. Léger was a Sinophile and had a strong interest in Chinese culture. St. Léger's great hope as secretary-general was to see the Soviet Union and the United States both join the League. St. Léger was described by the British historian D.C. Watt as the "cold genius" of the Quai d'Orsay, a brilliant diplomat whose intelligence and ruthlessness made him invaluable to successive French foreign ministers over an eight year period. Watt wrote that St. Léger was an excellent diplomat whose talents were negated by the mostly mediocre foreign ministers he served, but that St. Léger promoted a talented cadre of ambassadors that included René Massigli, Charles Corbin, Robert Coulondre, Emile Naggier and François Charles-Roux. The American historian Elizabeth Cameron wrote: "From the start he was no ordinary diplomat. He was a poet, and as a poet, lived in a world not much frequented by other diplomats. But he was also capable of their world, experienced in many worlds, and not least in the worldly society of the French capital. His courtesy was famous, though not always comfortable, and of a kind to put him out of reach. Many and most of all the worldly and the ambitious, were made uneasy by his aloofness, the subtleties of his language, and the sinuous progressions of his thought".  

The first great crisis faced by St. Léger as secretary-general was the Lytton report, which had concluded that Japan had committed aggression by seizing Manchuria from China in 1931. In 1931, the Chinese delegation at the League of Nations had accused Japan of aggression by seizing Manchuria, which led the League to appoint a commission under Lord Lytton to determine if Japan had committed aggression or not. St. Léger favored having the League General Assembly "approve" and "adopt" the Lytton report, but then leave the resolution of the Sino-Japanese dispute to the mediation by the powers that had signed the 9-Power Treaty of 1922 plus Germany and the Soviet Union. In a report St. Léger wrote about the crisis in Asia, he described both Japan and China as both hostile towards France's special rights in China, but wrote that Japan was by far the most dangerous of the two. St. Léger wrote that ever since the mid-1920s Japan had been "regressing" towards "Asian particularism". St. Léger used as an example of Japan's "regression" the rather violent police campaign against "western decadence" such as young couples kissing in public (traditionally considered to be disgusting behavior in Japan). Besides for a general hostility towards western values shown by the Japanese state, St. Léger wrote that even more disturbing were the claims of an "Asian Monroe Doctrine" in which all of Asia was considered to be Japan's sphere of influence. St. Léger wrote that Japan was steadily moving away from "integration into the entente between the great world powers" and "from the contractual system of the League". He concluded that Japan was conducting "a systematic program of wild imperialism", which he predicated might one day cause a war.  St. Léger advocated that France should vote for sanctions against Japan at the League General Assembly as he argued that this was the best way of stopping a war in Asia. St. Léger wrote that the colony of French Indochina, France's other colonies in the Pacific, and its special rights in China, especially the French Concession in Shanghai, were profitable and worth defending against Japan. St. Léger wrote the main danger was to French Indochina was the "reorganization on its border, with or against Japan, of a united and disciplined China". St. Léger argued that French diplomacy had to be careful to not appear to be offering "unqualified approval of Chinese claims and methods" and to avoid a solution that "would push Japan towards extreme methods". AS it was, when the Lytton commission report was presented in March 1933, Japan left the League of Nations in protest. St. Léger's advocacy of closer ties with Britain and if possible, the United States as well, were much as motivated by fear of Japan as fear of Germany.

Of the foreign ministers, St. Léger served after 1932, only Louis Barthou he respected as he wrote that he had the vision to achieve "the great rules of French diplomacy". St. Léger wrote that he wanted to maintain the Locarno system as he stated: "The structure of Locarno was for a decade our only cornerstone in Europe; the only one which inspired the respect of Hitler by the precision and strictness of its mechanism, the only one which felt obliged to acknowledge officially and repeatedly until the moment which he discerned the inner weaknesses of the beneficiaries of the system". In 1934, Barthou initially considered sacking St. Léger as he believed him to be opposed to his policy of seeking an alliance with the Soviet Union, but changed his mind after he discovered St. Léger was the ideal man to conduct the talks with the Soviets. St. Léger wrote the assassination of Barthou in Marseilles while greeting King Alexander of Yugoslavia was a great blow to French diplomacy as he considered Barthou to be the only effective foreign minister he served.   Pierre Laval sough an alliance with Italy and was prepared to cede the Aouzou Strip of French Northwest Africa to win the friendship of Benito Mussolini. St. Léger felt that Laval was far too keen for an agreement with Mussolini as he wrote that he only wanted a voyage de Rome and put little attention to the details of the agreement, which inspired St. Léger to threaten to resign in protest.  St. Léger who went with Laval to Rome for the summit with Mussolini was excluded from the private meetings where Laval essentially gave Mussolini a free hand to invade Ethiopia. Likewise, St. Léger felt that Laval was too keen to make his voyage de Moscow to meet Joseph Stalin, which St. Léger wrote was for him merely a voyage de cabotin.. When  St. Léger objected that more time was needed to prepare for the Franco-Soviet alliance, Laval replied: "Vous couchez avec les affaires".  

St. Léger was a close friend of Edvard Beneš, the long-time foreign minister of Czechoslovakia who became president in 1935, and he tended to take a strong pro-Czechoslovak line. The Canadian historian John Cairns described as St. Leger as a "rather strange" character who chose to undercut policy initiatives that he disapproved of. The eccentric St. Leger was especially noted for his obsession with writing long erotic poems which circulated as manuscripts amongst his friends celebrating the beauty and sensuality of women and the joys of sex, on which he spent a disproportionate amount of time on. Between 13-15 May 1935, St. Léger went to Moscow with the premier of the republic,  Pierre Laval, to sign the Franco-Soviet alliance. Foreign visitors were rarely allowed to see Joseph Stalin in the Kremlin, and it was considered a great honor that Laval and the rest of the French visitors were allowed to meet Stalin along with the premier, Vyacheslav Molotov and the foreign commissar Maxim Litvinov. As was normally the case, Stalin said little and instead phlegmatically smoked his pipe while Molotov and Litvinov did most of the talking. As Litvinov was fluent in French and was more charming than the "hard man" Molotov, St. Léger spoke to him the most. On the return trip to Paris, St. Léger attended the funeral of Poland's de facto leader, Marshal Józef Piłsudski in Warsaw and in Berlin attended Laval's meeting with Hermann Göring.

During the Abyssinia Crisis, St. Léger proposed in November 1935 a meeting between the British Foreign Secretary Sir Samuel Hoare with Laval. On 7-8 December 1935, Hoare met with Laval in Paris where the two agreed to the Hoare-Laval pact under which Italy would receive two-thirds of Ethiopia in exchange for ending the war. In December 1935, St. Leger was opposed to the Hoare-Laval Pact to essentially reward Italy for invading Ethiopia. He saw Laval's policy of seeking to improve relations with Italy at the expense of Ethiopia as amoral and sabotaged the Hoare-Laval pact by leaking it to the French press.  On 13 December 1935, the columnist Geneviève Tabouis in L'Œuvre and the columnist André Géraud who wrote under the pen-name Pertinax in L'Echo de Paris both broke the story of the Hoare-Laval pact, which led to highly negative reactions in both France and the United Kingdom. In London, the news of the Hoare-Laval pact came very close to bringing down the government of Stanley Baldwin and Hoare was forced to resign in disgrace, being made the "fall guy" as Baldwin lied to the House of Commons by claiming that Hoare was acting on his initiative.

St. Léger that it was the remiliziation of the Rhineland, not the Munich Agreement, that was the turning point in France's fortunes. St. Léger wrote: "It was the London conference of March 1936, not Munich, which must bear the responsibility for Hitler's flooding over the banks".  
  
After the League of Nations sanctions against Italy ended in July 1936, the French tried hard to revive the Stresa Front, displaying "...an almost humiliating determination to retain Italy as an ally".  The American historian Barry Sullivan wrote "A.J.P. Taylor erred in asserting that the British and the French drove Mussolini into an alliance with Hitler. Ironically, Mussolini responded to Germany, Britain and France in inverse proportion to their degree of dishonesty and their threat to Italy: Germany, which consistently treated Italy worse than did the other two countries, was rewarded with Mussolini's friendship; France, which generally offered Italy the highest level of co-operation and true partnership, was rewarded with rebuffs and abuse. British policy and Mussolini's reaction to it, fell between these extremes"   Both the British and the French very much wanted a rapprochement with Italy to undo the damage caused by the League of Nations sanctions, and Sullivan wrote: "That Mussolini chose to ally with Hitler, rather than being forced.". St. Léger had a very strong dislike of Fascist Italy and consistently opposed the effort to improve relations with Rome as he argued that Mussolini was set about an anti-French alliance with Germany, and there was nothing that French diplomacy could do to change Mussolini's foreign policy choices. 

Within the Foreign Office he led the optimist faction that believed that Germany was unstable and that if Britain and France stood up to Hitler, he would back down. In January 1937, rumors started to appear in the French newspapers that stated the Wehrmacht was operating in Spanish Morocco. The closeness of Spanish Morocco to the Strait of Gibraltar that linked the Mediterranean Sea to the Atlantic ocean led the possibility of a German military presence in Spanish Morroco to be considered unacceptable in both Paris and London.  As the Foreign Minister Yvon Delbos was out of Paris, St. Léger was in charge of the Quai d'Orsay and he acted with dispatch, having meeting with the German ambassador Count Johannes von Welczeck, where he protested in the most strongest terms, saying he regarded a German military presence in Spanish Morocco as a threat to French interests. St. Léger was close to the French ambassador in London, Charles Corbin, and had him secure a promise of British support from Robert Vansittart, the Permeant Undersecretary at the Foreign Office. Cameron noted that the Germans were outraged by  St. Léger's démarche as she wrote: "They had felt a strong hand at the helm of French foreign policy and they didn't like it. Thus, the incident added another black mark to their dossier on Léger as a public enemy of the Reich".

The Sudetenland crisis and after
On 5 April 1938, St. Léger attended a conference at the Quai d'Orsay concerning Eastern Europe alongside Joseph Paul-Boncour the Foreign Minister; Robert Coulondre, the ambassador in Moscow; Léon Noël, the ambassador in Warsaw;  Victor de Lacroix, the minister in Prague;  Raymond Brugère, the minister in Belgrade; and Adrien Thierry, the minister in Bucharest.  The principle conclusion of the conference was that as long as France's allies in Eastern Europe continued to feud with each other, no resistance to Nazi Germany was possible. The conference ended with a plan being adopted to see it if was possible for King Carol II of Romania to allow the Red Army transit rights across Romania to aid Czechoslovakia in the event of a German invasion, which in turn led to Coulondre and Thierry being assigned to find a way to end the  Bessarabia dispute as Carol would not allow the Red Army to enter his kingdom as long as the Soviet Union continued to claim Bessarabia. Much anger was expressed during the conference at the Polish Foreign Minister Colonel Józef Beck, whose attitude towards Czechoslovakia was hostile at best and who was utterly against granting the Red Army transit rights across Poland to aid Czechoslovakia in the event of a German invasion.      

St. Léger favored "la ligne anglaise" ("the English line") of seeking closer ties with Britain. St. Léger favored the British policy during the Sudetenland crisis of seeking concessions from Beneš out of the belief that ultimately the Chamberlain government would come to see that Adolf Hitler was the problem in Czechoslovak-German relations after Beneš made enough concessions, and then swing around to the support of Czechoslovakia. He accompanied the French Premier Édouard Daladier at the Munich Conference in 1938, where the cession of part of the Sudetenland region of Czechoslovakia to Germany was agreed to. 

In October 1938, the pro-appeasement Foreign Minister Georges Bonnet carried out a purge of the Quai d'Orsay, sidelining a number of officials opposed to his policy. In the aftermath of the purge, Bonnet was congratulated by the equally pro-appeasement British ambassador Sir Eric Phipps for removing the "warmongers" René Massigli and Pierre Comert from the Quai d'Orsay, but he went on to complain that Bonnet should have sacked Secretary-General St. Léger as well.  In response, Bonnet claimed that he and St. Léger saw "eye to eye" about the policy to be pursued towards Germany and Italy. Phipps, who knew about the true state of relations between the two, drily noted that "in that case the eyes must be astigmatic". In fact, Bonnet had very much wanted to sack St. Léger, but the latter was protected by his friendship with Daladier. Contrary to Bonnet's policy of seeking to end the French alliance system in Eastern Europe, in November 1938, St. Léger played a key role in sending out a French mission to Yugoslavia, Romania and Bulgaria to increase French economic influence in the Balkans. On 6 December 1938, St. Léger was present in the Clock Room of the Quai d'Orsay standing alongside Count von Welczeck as he watched the Declaration of Franco-German Friendship that was signed by Bonnet and the German Foreign Minister Joachim von Ribbentrop. During the visit of Ribbentrop, he and Bonnet went out for a walk in the Tuileries Garden where Bonnet was said to have told Ribbentrop that the French alliance system in Eastern Europe was over and that France now recognized Eastern Europe as being within Germany's exclusive sphere of influence.  St. Léger who was present during the walk in the Tuileries Garden denied that Bonnet made that claim and instead stated that Bonnet had actually said was that France now recognized Czecho-Slovakia as being in the German sphere of influence. Regardless of what Bonnet actually said, Ribbentrop upon his return to Berlin told Hitler that France now accepted that Eastern Europe was within the sphere of influence of the Reich and there was no danger of France going to war for Poland.

When Germany violated the Munich Agreement on 15 March 1939 by occupying the Czech half of Czecho-Slovakia which was turned into the Protectorate of Bohemia and Moravia,  St. Léger was outraged and argued that Robert Coulondre, the ambassador in Berlin, should be recalled in protest to show the Germans "the seriousness of the situation". In an unusual move, he met privately with Daladier to complain about "the weak attitude and hesitancy of M. Bonnet, and against his being himself 'surrounded with reticence'" as he charged that Bonnet kept him in the dark about what he was doing. When Bonnet went to London to see Chamberlain and Lord Halifax four days later, St. Léger was ordered to stay in Paris as Bonnet felt that St. Léger would take a different line with the British than what he favored. In a memo he wrote about the "probable attitude" of Britain and Poland, St. Léger wrote that the foreign policy of Colonel Beck was entirely "cynical and false", and that Beck wanted a military alliance with Britain, which he believed the British would refuse. St. Léger further predicated that Beck would follow his usual "hand-to-mouth policy" and moved closer to the Reich when the Chamberlain government refused to "undertake a definite commitment" to defend Poland. Regarding the United Kingdom,  St. Léger predicated that "France and Great Britain were at the turning of the road".

The Danzig crisis
During the Danzig crisis, St. Léger very much favored Daladier's plans for a "peace front" of the Soviet Union, France and the United Kingdom to deter Germany from invading Poland. During the Tilea Affair of March 1939 when France's ally Romania appeared to be on the brink of a German invasion to seize its oil wells, St. Léger was furious with Colonel Beck, whose statements implied that Poland would not assist Romania as Beck noted that the Romanian-Polish alliance only applied against the Soviet Union, not Germany. At a meeting with Juliusz Łukasiewicz, the Polish ambassador in Paris, St. Léger expressed his rage, saying: "Poland refuses to join France and England in protecting Romania". St. Léger sent a long letter to both the British Foreign Secretary Lord Halifax and the prime minister Neville Chamberlain that denounced Colonel Beck as a ruthless, unscrupulous and devious opportunist whose word was not to be trusted and who was about to ally Poland to the Reich. At a meeting with Phipps, St. Léger expressed the hope that Britain would not "put the cart before the horse" by subordinating decision-making to King Carol II of Romania, whom St. Léger distrusted almost as much as he distrusted Beck. St. Léger had a dismissive view of France's allies in Eastern Europe as he told Phipps: "These governments would decide their attitude in accordance with the intentions of France and Great Britain. In any case, they were only what he called 'corollaries'". 

Starting on 18 March 1939, St. Léger took to cultivating American public opinion by using 25, 000 francs to cover the travel expense to send out various English-speaking French cultural figures such as André Maurois, Ève Curie, Jules Romains, and Georges Duhamel to tour the United States. St. Léger believed that the promise of American support would be essential to allow France to face the Reich in the Danzig crisis, and he felt that such cultural diplomacy using the historical relationship between France and the United States as well their shared democratic values would win the American public over to a more favorable view of France. Much to St. Léger's surprise, on 31 March 1939, Chamberlain reversed his long-standing policy of "no commitments beyond the Rhine" by announcing in the House of Commons the famous British "guarantee" of Poland.  

During the Danzig crisis, relations between Bonnet and Daladier became increasing strained and hostile as the two men held diametrically opposed views about whatever France should go to war for Poland. Starting in April 1939, Daladier worked to marginalise Bonnet by dealing directly with St. Léger and entirely by-passing the foreign minister. St. Léger knew from the reports of the Deuxième Bureau that the Chamberlain government was deeply worried about the prospect of Japan taking advantage of a war in Europe to seize Britain's Asian colonies and threaten Australia and New Zealand, and wanted American support in the Pacific. On 11 April 1939, Lord Halifax had written a letter to U.S. President Franklin D. Roosevelt asking him to move the U.S. Atlantic fleet to the Pacific to dissuade the Japanese from taking advantage of the Danzig crisis, a request that Roosevelt had refused. Knowing that the British would be more active in Europe if the Americans were more involved in Asia, St. Léger met with  William Christian Bullitt Jr., the American ambassador in Paris and a close friend of Roosevelt's, to tell him that the Deuxième Bureau was aware of a secret German-Japanese plan that Japan would attack the European colonies in Asia the moment Germany invaded Poland. Prying on American stereotypes of Britain, St. Léger told Bullitt that pressure from the City had led Chamberlain to decide to send the main part of the Royal Navy to Singapore (the major British naval base in Asia) and accordingly the Danzig crisis was more likely to end in war. Bullitt-who talked on the telephone on a weekly basis with Roosevelt-accordingly passed on these claims to Roosevelt, who reversed himself and ordered much of the U.S. Atlantic fleet transferred over the Pacific fleet.  St. Léger himself was concerned about the Japanese as he noted that in February 1939 the Japanese had occupied the Spratly Islands in the South China Sea, which placed Japanese forces very close to French Indochina while France could spare no naval forces for Asia because of the crisis in Europe.

St. Léger had an anti-clerical views and was strongly opposed to the offer of Pope Piux XII to mediate an end to the Danzig crisis. St. Léger told Phipps that most of the senior officials of the Catholic Church hierarchy were closeted gay men who had been blackmailed into working for the Fascist regime. St. Léger called the Pope's mediation offer a power play by Mussolini, and stated that Cardinal Maglione, the right-hand man of the Pontiff, was acting as an Italian rather as an agent of the Vatican. St. Léger ended by saying the Vatican should restrict itself to appeals for peace "on a general basis and usual plane for peace" and to "not get involved in political matters which it should leave to the Chancelleries". 

French decision-makers were far more keen on having the Soviet Union join the "peace front" to protect Poland than British decision-makers, and St. Léger was annoyed with the attitude of Chamberlain who continued to insist that Britain would never sign a military alliance with the Soviet Union. On 20 May 1939, Lord Halifax stopped by in Paris on his way to Geneva to attend the spring session of the League of Nations.. During his stop-over in Paris, Halifax was confronted by Daladier, Bonnet and St. Léger who told him very firmly that only a military alliance with the Soviet Union could stop Germany from invading Poland, and warned him if Chamberlain continued his foot-dragging, the result would be war in 1939. Halifax came away from his meeting in Paris converted to the French point-of-view and upon his return to London stated that Britain should start talks for an alliance with Moscow. St. Léger very much expected the Anglo-French-Soviet talks for an alliance to be successful. In a meeting with Bullitt on 28 June 1939 St. Léger stated to him "there were eighty chances in a hundred" of the Anglo-French-Soviet talks "would be successfully concluded in the near-future". On 30 June 1939, St. Léger told Bullitt that the best hope of stopping the Danzig crisis from turning into a war were an alliance with the Soviet Union and American military aid to France, especially aircraft.

Ever since the Abyssinia crisis of 1935-1936, it had been French policy to repair relations with Italy, which St. Léger disliked. French plans for a war with Germany required bringing over soldiers from Algeria and the rest of the Maghreb to compensate for the numerical superiority of the Wehrmacht, and the possibility of the Regia Marina cutting France off from the Maghreb was considered very concerning in Paris. In a memo, St. Léger wrote that Benito Mussolini had evidently decided upon alignment with Germany and that: "Every effort to bring them [the Italians] back to us is destined to fail; it will only encourage them in their two-faced policy, leading them to name the highest price for their assets and making them value even more highly the benefits the Axis could offer them". St. Léger complained that allies of Bonnet in his "peace lobby" such as the Public Works minister Anatole de Monzie were holding unofficial talks with Italian diplomats on their own, which he felt was Bonnet's way of cutting out the Quai d'Orsay from his foreign policy. André François-Poncet, the French ambassador in Rome, was opposed to St. Léger's policy and felt it was still possible to "detach" the Italians from an alliance with Germany. St. Léger ordered  François-Poncet to stick to his "day-to-day business", which led François-Poncet to lash out against him as he told the Italian Foreign Minister Count Galeazzo Ciano that St. Léger was a "sinister man" opposed to better Franco-Italian relations. Phipps had served as the British ambassador in Berlin between 1933-1937 where he became a close friend of François-Poncet, who served as the French ambassador in Berlin between 1931-1938. All through the spring and summer of 1939, Phipps wrote letters to  François-Poncet that accused St. Léger of "Italophobia" and of being rigidly hostile towards the Fascist regime as Phipps noted that St. Léger disliked Mussolini as a person. Both Phipps and François-Poncet believed it was possible to "detach" Fascist Italy from alignment with Nazi Germany, and both felt that St. Léger was the principle man blocking  rapprochement with Italy.  Cameron wrote that events proved St. Léger correct about Italy as even though the French did not make the concessions to the Italians that Bonnet and François-Poncet favored, Italy still remained neutral when the war began and only entered the war on 10 June 1940 when it was already clear that France was defeated. 

St. Léger very much welcomed the change in British policy during the Danzig crisis, as he noted the lack of British support in 1938 had made it "impossible" for France to face Germany on its own. Despite his dislike of Colonel Beck, St. Léger favored a policy of Britain and France making generous loans to Poland to assist with the modernization of the Polish military "...at once in order to convince the Germans that France and England are determined to support Poland if Poland should become involved in a war with Germany". On 2 August 1939, Bonnet told Philps that his main enemies in the cabinet were Daladier, the Finance minister Paul Reynaud, the Navy minister César Campinchi, the Interior minister Albert Sarraut, and the Colonial Minister Georges Mandel. Bonnet further stated that his enemies within the Quai d'Orsay were St. Léger (whom Bonnet accused of being very disloyal to him) along with Robert Coulondre, the ambassador in Berlin and Charles Corbin, the ambassador in London as he noted that both Coulondre and Corbin were friends of St. Léger. 

In common with other French officials, St. Léger was very much enraged at Colonel Beck who was completely against allowing the Red Army to enter Poland if Germany should invade while the Soviets insisted on such transit rights as the precondition for the "peace front". In Moscow, Marshal Kliment Voroshilov, the Soviet defense commissar, had told General Joseph Doumenc of the French military mission that his government regarded the issue of transit rights as of paramount importance as he insisted that if the French could not pressure the Poles into granting transit rights for the Red Army, then as far as he was concerned France was not serious about the "peace front". On 22 August 1939, St. Léger advised the French cabinet that France should issue a threatening démarche in Warsaw to force Beck to allow the Red Army transit rights as he argued that the issue was on the verge of causing the proposed "peace front" to collapse. The Ribbentrop-Molotov non-aggression pact of 23 August 1939 stunned French decision-makers and is known in France as "the diplomatic Waterloo of French history" as the French never saw it coming. The executive decision-makers in Paris had always expected the "peace front" to be created in one form or another, and the Molotov-Ribbentrop pact came as a shocking and most unpleasant surprise in Paris. In desperation, Daladier ordered General Joseph Doumenc to tell the lie that Beck had finally granted the transit rights. Because such hopes had been invested in the "peace front" in France, the debate over who was responsible for its failure was especially bitter. Reynaud accused St. Léger of being the man responsible for the failure to create the "peace front" as he accused St. Léger of moving too slowly and of not doing enough to pressure Colonel Beck to grant transit rights to the Red Army. On 25 August 1939, Daladier told Łukasiewicz that he was not to talk to Bonnet under any conditions, saying the views of the Foreign Minister regarding the Danzig crisis were not his own, and told the Polish ambassador to only talk to himself or St. Léger. At a cabinet meeting of 31 August 1939, Daladier was described as having "bristled like a hedgehog" at the cabinet meeting as he exploded in rage at Bonnet as he warned the planned conference was a "trap" and he accused Bonnet of sullying France's honor with his opposition to declaring war. At a crucial moment, Daladier read out a letter from Coulondre that St. Léger had kept secret from Bonnet that won over the majority of the French cabinet to Daladier's position.

After Germany invaded Poland on 1 September 1939, Mussolini proposed a peace conference to stop the war. Bonnet, who wanted to avoid declaring war on Germany, saw Mussolini's proposal as a way to avoid war. In an effort to sabotage Bonnet's plans, St. Léger had Corbin tell Lord Halifax later on the afternoon of 1 September that the British and French governments should place a time limit on Mussolini's proposed conference, saying that otherwise the Germans would stall and the war would continue.. This message to Corbin was the precise opposite of what Bonnet had wanted Corbin to tell Lord Halifax. Faced with a choice between obeying the foreign minister and the secretary-general, Corbin chose the latter. At a crucial meeting of the French cabinet, Bonnet argued that France should not declare war on Germany and instead embrace Mussolini's conference. Before the meeting, St. Léger had briefed Daladier and warned him that the conference was merely a trick to prevent France and Britain from declaring war as Germany would continue the war against Poland while the preparations for the conference continued, quite possibly for months. In a memo to Daladier, St. Léger wrote that it was unacceptable to be holding a peace conference while the Reich was waging war on Poland as he concluded:  "If such negotiations were to be started by a retreat on the part of the Allies and under the threat of German force, the democracies would soon find themselves faced with wholly unacceptable Axis terms. There would be war anyway and under especially unfavorable conditions. No, the trap is too obvious".  In an unusual move, Bonnet denounced St. Léger in a press conference for having sabotaged his policy as he contended that Mussolini's peace conference would have ended the war.

When the declaration of war was finally drafted by Bonnet, it evaded the expression la guerre and instead spoke in convoluted terms that France "would fulfil those obligations contracted towards Poland, which the German government is aware of". Even then, Bonnet in an attempt to avoid war ordered Coulondre to make the expiry of the ultimatum to be set for 5: 00 am on 4 September 1939.. Coulondre phoned St. Léger in Paris to ask what he should if Ribbentrop should try to stall him, which led St. Léger to order him to treat any stalling as a negative reply. At that point, Bonnet took the phone from St. Léger to tell Coulondre that the expiry of the ultimatum was to be moved up to 5 pm on 3 September 1939.

Dismissal
On 13 September 1939, Daladier finally fired Bonnet as Foreign Minister as he stated that Bonnet's foreign policy was not his foreign policy. As Daladier was also the premier, he did not have much time for diplomacy and St. Léger was the de facto French foreign minister until May 1940. Daladier usually met daily with St. Léger and Coulondre, who was regarded as the German expert within the Quai d'Orsay, and tended to follow their advice. In February 1940, Sumner Welles, the undersecretary of state, visited the major European capitals on a peace mission for President Roosevelt. During Welles's visit to Paris,  St. Léger told him: "The game is lost. France is alone against three dictators. Great Britain is not ready and the United States has not even amended the neutrality act. Once again, the democracies have arrived too late". It is unlikely that this statement represented  St. Léger's real feelings and was more likely a gambit to try to force the Roosevelt administration to provide more aid to France.. Welles wrote he was struck by "magnificent clarity and logic" shown by St. Léger just as he had "as always shown" and by the "innately liberal nature of his political philosophy".  Relations between France and Britain were often strained during the winter of 1939-1940 and in March 1940 Daladier told St. Léger "that what had really taken the stuffing out of him was his loss of faith in his ability ever to induce the British government to take prompt action or a firm line". 

St. Léger was close to Daladier, and after the fall of the Daladier government in March 1940, he was out of favor with the new premier Paul Reynaud. Reynaud's mistress, the Comtesse Hélène de Portes had a particular dislike of St. Léger and lobbied her lover very strongly to dismiss him as the secretary-general of the Quai d'Orsay. On 16 May 1940, the Wehrmacht won the Second Battle of Sedan and broke through the French lines along the Meuse river, throwing Paris into a state of panic as it was believed that the capital would fall within hours. St. Léger oversaw the burning of the records of the Quai d'Orsay which thrown into a giant bonfire in the garden of the Ministry of Foreign Affairs. Reynaud reshuffled his cabinet on 18 May 1940 and appointed Daladier as the new foreign minister.. Portes lobbied Reynaud to dismiss St. Léger before Daladier arrived at the Quai d'Orsay, saying that the "Léger scalp" was worth 70 votes in the chambre des députés. On the morning of 19 May 1940  St. Léger learned from reading the morning newspaper that he had just been fired as secretary-general. Georges Mandel, the minister of colonies, was opposed to St. Léger's sacking, telling Reynaud that firing a senior diplomat well known for his anti-Nazi views, was sending the wrong message.   In mid-July 1940, Leger began a long exile in Washington, DC.

Later life 
In 1940, the Vichy government dismissed him from the Légion d'honneur order and revoked his French citizenship (it was reinstated after the war). Likewise, all of St. Léger's assets were confiscated.  St. Léger's apartment in Paris was looted by the Wehrmacht who burned several of his unpublished poems, much to his distress when he learned that his poems were now lost forever. Found inside of St. Léger's apartment was a copy of the Treaty of Versailles on which the German soldiers mocking wrote: "Much good may it do you now, last defender of the last French victory!" St. Léger was opposed to Vichy, but did not support the movement led by General Charles de Gaulle. He was in some financial difficulty as an exile in Washington until Archibald MacLeish, the director of the Library of Congress and himself a poet, raised enough private donations to enable the library to employ him until his official retirement from the French civil service in 1947. He declined a teaching position at Harvard University.

During his American exile, he wrote his long poems Exil, Vents, Pluies, Neiges, Amers, and Chroniques. He remained in the US long after the end of the war. He travelled extensively, observing nature and enjoying the friendship of US Attorney General Francis Biddle and his spouse, philanthropist Beatrice Chanler, and author Katherine Garrison Chapin. He was on good terms with the UN Secretary General and author Dag Hammarskjöld.

In 1957, American friends gave him a villa at Giens, Provence, France. He then split his time between France and the United States. In 1958, he married the American Dorothy Milburn Russell.

In 1960, he was awarded the Nobel Prize in Literature. After receiving the Nobel Prize, he wrote the long poems Chronique, Oiseaux and Chant pour un équinoxe and the shorter Nocturne and Sécheresse. In 1962, Georges Braque worked with master printmaker Aldo Crommelynck to create a series of etchings and aquatints, L'Ordre des Oiseaux, which was published with the text of Perse's Oiseaux by Au Vent d'Arles.

A few months before he died, Leger donated his library, manuscripts and private papers to Fondation Saint-John Perse, a research centre devoted to his life and work (Cité du Livre, Aix-en-Provence), which remains active to the present day. He died in his villa in Giens and is buried nearby.

Works
Éloges (1911, transl. Eugène Jolas in 1928, Louise Varèse in 1944, Eleanor Clark and Roger Little in 1965, King Bosley in 1970)
Anabase (1924, transl. T.S. Eliot in 1930, Roger Little in 1970)
Exil (1942, transl. Denis Devlin, 1949)
Pluies (1943, transl. Denis Devlin in 1944)
Poème à l'étrangère (1943, transl. Denis Devlin in 1946)
Neiges (1944, transl. Denis Devlin in 1945, Walter J. Strachan in 1947)
Vents (1946, transl. Hugh Chisholm in 1953)
Amers (1957, transl. Wallace Fowlie in 1958, extracts by George Huppert in 1956, Samuel E. Morison in 1964)
Chronique (1960, transl. Robert Fitzgerald in 1961)
Poésie (1961, transl. W. H. Auden in 1961)
Oiseaux (1963, transl. Wallace Fowlie in 1963, Robert Fitzgerald in 1966, Roger Little in 1967, Derek Mahon in 2002)
Pour Dante (1965, transl. Robert Fitzgerald in 1966)
Chanté par celle qui fut là (1969, transl. Richard Howard in 1970)
Chant pour un équinoxe (1971)
Nocturne (1973)
Sécheresse (1974)
Collected Poems (1971) Bollingen Series, Princeton University Press.
Œuvres complètes (1972), Bibliothèque de la Pléiade, Gallimard. The definitive edition of his work. Leger designed and edited this volume, which includes a detailed chronology of his life, speeches, tributes, hundreds of letters, notes, a bibliography of the secondary literature, and extensive extracts from those parts of that literature the author liked. Enlarged edition, 1982.

Homages 

 A bronze monument, Hommage à Saint-John Perse, sculpted by Patrice Alexandre (ordered by the french Ministry of Culture in 1985), was inaugurated in 1992 in the garden of the National Museum of Natural History in Paris. 
 András Beck notably produced a bronze mask of Saint-John Perse, covered with gold leaf, which served as a cover vignette for his work in the edition of the Bibliothèque de la Pléiade.
 The Saint-John Perse Museum is partly dedicated to him in Point-à-Pitre, his birthplace.
 His name was given to various streets and libraries in France.
 The 2007 promotion of heritage curators from the french National Heritage Institute bears his name.
 A Reims tramway station bears his name.
 In October 1980, the French Post dedicated a stamp to him with a face value of 1.40 + 0.30 francs, available simultaneously in Pointe-à-Pitre and Aix-en-Provence.  For the centenary of the creation of the Nobel Prizes, the British Virgin Islands issued in 2001 a 40-cent stamp bearing his image.
 The Saint-John Perse high school in Pau bears his name.

See also
[[Le Monde's 100 Books of the Century|Le Mondes 100 Books of the Century]], a list which includes Amers

Secondary literature in English1936S. A. Rhodes, "Poetry of Saint-John Perse", The Sewanee Review, vol. XLIV, no. 1, January – March 19361944Paul Rosenfeld, "The Poet Perse", The Nation, New York, vol. CLVIII, no. 20, 15 May 1944
John Gould Fletcher, "On the Poetry of Alexis Saint-Leger Leger", Quarterly Review of Literature, vol. II, Autumn 1944
Edouard Roditi, "Éloges and other poems, Saint-John Perse", Contemporary Poetry, Baltimore, vol. IV, no. 3, Autumn 19441945Conrad Aiken, "Rains, by Saint-John Perse. Whole Meaning or Doodles", New Republic, Washington, no. CXII, 16 April 19451948David Gascoigne, "Vents by Saint-John Perse", Poetry, London, June–July 19481949Valery Larbaud, préface à Anabasis, translated by Jacques Le Clerq, in Anabasis, New York, Harcourt, Brace and C°, 1949
Hugo von Hofmannsthal, préface à Anabasis, translated by James Stern, ibid.
Giuseppe Ungaretti, préface à Anabasis, translated by Adrienne Foulke, ibid.
Archibald MacLeish, "The Living Spring", Saturday Review, vol. XXXII, no. 24, 16 July 1949
Hubert Creekmore, "An Epic Poem of the Primitive Man", New York Times Book Review, 25 December 19491950Allen Tate, "Hommage to Saint-John Perse", Poetry, Chicago, LXXV, January 1950
Harold W. Watts, "Anabase: The Endless Film", University of Toronto Quarterly, vol XIX, no. 3, April 1950
Stephen Spender, "Tribute to Saint-John Perse", Cahiers de la Pléiade, Paris, Summer–Autumn 19501952Amos Wilder, "Nature and the immaculate world in Saint-John Perse", in Modern Poetry and the Christian tradition, New York, 1952
Katherine Garrison Chapin, "Saint-John Perse. Notes on Some Poetic Contrasts", The Sewanee Review1953Paul Claudel, "A Poem by St.-John Perse", translation by Hugh Chisholm, in Winds, New York, Pantheon Books, Bollingen Series, no. 34, 1953.
Gaëtan Picon, "The Most Proudly Free", translation by Willard R. Trask, ibid, 1st edition in Les Cahiers de la Pléiade, no. 10, été–automne 1950.
Albert Béguin, "A Poetry Marked by Scansion", translation by Willard R. Trask, ibid, 1st edition in Les Cahiers de la Pléiade, no. 10, été–automne 1950.
Gabriel Bounoure, "St.-John Perse and Poetic Ambiguity", translation by Willard R. Trask, ibid, 1st edition in Les Cahiers de la Pléiade, no. 10, été–automne 1950
Wallace Fowlie, "The Poetics of Saint-John Perse", Poetry,, Chicago, vol. LXXXII, no. 6, September 1953
Hayden Carruth, "Winds by Saint-John Perse... Parnassus stormed", The Partisan Review, vol. XX, no. 5, September–October 1953
Henri Peyre, "Exile by Saint-John Perse", Shenandoah, Lexington, vol. V, Winter 19531956"Tribute to Saint-John Perse", The Berkeley Review (Arthur J. Knodel, René Girard, Georges Huppert), vol. I, no. 1, Berkeley, 19561957Archibald MacLeish, "Saint-John Perse. The Living Spring", in A continuing journey. Essays and Addresses, Boston, 1957
Wallace Fowlie, "Saint-John Perse", in A Guide to Contemporary French Literature, From Valéry to Sartre, New York, 1957
Anonymous, "Saint-John Perse, Poet of the Far Shore", Times Literary Supplement, London, 2 March 1957
Paul West, "The Revival of Epic", The Twentieth Century, London, July 19571958Conrad Aiken, A Reviewer's A.B.C., Collected criticism from 1916, New York, 1958
Jacques Guicharnaud, "Vowels of the Sea: Amers", Yale French Studies, no. 21, Spring–Summer 1958
Martin Turnell, "The Epic of Saint-John Perse", The Commonweal, LXX, 17 July 1958
W. H. Auden, "A Song of Life's Power to Renew", New York Times Book Review, vol. LXIII, no. 30, 27 July 1958
Melvin Maddocks, "Perse as Cosmologist", Christian Science Monitor, 4 September 1958
John Marshall, "The Greatest Living French Poet", The Yale Review, XLVIII, September 1958
Katherine Garrison Chapin, "Perse On the Sea With Us: Amers", The New Republic, Washington, CXXXIX, 27 October 19581959H.-J. Kaplan,"Saint-John Perse: The Recreation of the World", The Reporter, XV, 22 January 1959
Raymond Mortimer, "Mr Eliot and Mr Perse: Two Fine Poets in tandem", Sunday Times, London, May 1959
Philip Toynbee, "A Great Modern Poet", The Observer, London, 31 May 1959
Charles Guenther, "Prince Among the Prophets", Poetry, Chicago, vol. XCIII, no. 5, 19591976Joseph Henry McMahon, A Bibliography of works by and about Saint-John Perse, Stanford University, 19591960Stanley Burnshaw, "Saint-John Perse", in The Poem Itself, New York, 1960
Joseph MacMahon, "A Question of Man", Commonweal, LXXIII, 13 January 1960
Byron Colt, "Saint-John Perse", Accent, New York, XX, 3, Summer 1960
Joseph Barry, "Science and Poetry Merge in the Crucial Stage of Creation", New York Post, 12 December 19601961Bernard Weinberg, The Limits of Symbolism. Studies of Five Modern French Poets. Baudelaire, Rimbaud, Mallarmé, Valéry, Saint-John Perse, Manchester, 1961
Anthony Hartley, "Saint-John Perse", Encounter, London, no. 2, Feb. 1961
Octavio Paz, "Saint-John Perse as Historian", The Nation, New York, 17 June 1961
Donald Davis, "Chronique by Saint-John Perse", New Statesman, London, LXII, 26 July 1961
John Montague, "The Poetry of Saint-John Perse", Irish Times, Dublin, 25 August 1961
Léon-S. Roudiez, "The Epochal Poetry of Saint-John Perse", Columbia University Forum, New York, vol. IV, 19611962Anthony Curtis, "Back to the Elements", The Sunday Telegraph, London, 7 January 1962
Amos Wilder, "St-John Perse and the Future of Man", Christianity and Crisis, New York, vol. XXI, no. 24, 22 January 1962
Ronald Gaskell, "The Poetry of Saint-John Perse", The London Magazine, vol. I, no. 12, March 1962
Peter Russel, "Saint-John Perse's Poetical works", Agenda, London, May–June 1962
Cecil Hemley, "Onward and Upward", Hudson Review, XV, Summer 19621963Eugenia Maria Arsenault, Color Imagery in the  Vents of Saint-John Perse, Catholic University of America, Washington, 19631964Arthur J. Knodel, "Towards an Understanding of Anabase", PMLA, June 1964
Eugenia Vassylkivsky, The Main Themes of Saint-John Perse, Columbia University, 19641966Arthur J. Knodel, Saint-John Perse. A Study of His Poetry, Edimburg, 1966
R. W. Baldner, "Saint-John Perse as Poet Prophet" in Proceedings of the Pacific Northwest Conference on Foreign Languages, vol. XVII, no. 22, 19661967Roger Little, Word Index of the Complete Poetry and Prose of Saint-John Perse, Durham, 1966 and 1967
M. Owen de Jaham, An Introduction to Saint-John Perse, University of South Western Louisiana, 19671968Kathleen Raine, "Saint-John Perse, Poet of the Marvellous", Encounter, vol. IV, no. 29, October 1967; idem in Defending Ancient Springs, Oxford, 19681969Roger Little, "T. S. Eliot and Saint-John Perse", The Arlington Quarterly Review, University of Texas, vol. II, no. 2, Autumn 19691970Charles Delamori, "The Love and Aggression of Saint-John Perse's Pluies", Yale French Studies, 1970
Richar O. Abel, The Relationship Between the Poetry of T. S. Eliot and Saint-John Perse, University of Southern California, 19701971Roger Little, Saint-John Perse. A Bibliography for Students of His Poetry, London, 1971
Ruth N. Horry, Paul Claudel and Saint-John Perse. Parallels and Contrasts, University of North Carolina Press, Chapel Hill, 1971
Pierre Emmanuel, Praise and Presence, with a Bibliography, Washington, 1971
Candace Uter De Russy, Saint-John Perse's Chronique: A study of Kronos and Other Themes through Imagery, Tulane University, 1971
Marc Goodhart, Poet and Poem in Exile, University of Colorado, 19711972René Galand, Saint-John Perse, New York, 1972
Richard Ruland, America as Metaphor in Modern French Letters. Celine, Julien Green and Saint-John Perse, New York, 19721973Roger Little, Saint-John Perse, University of London, 1973
Carol Nolan Rigolot, The Dialectics of Poetry: Saint-John Perse, University of Michigan, 19731974Richard-Allen Laden, Saint-John Perse's Vents: From Theme to Poetry, Yale University, 19741976Elizabeth Jackson, Worlds Apart Structural Parallels in the Poetry of Paul Valéry, Saint-John Perse, Benjamin Perret and René Char, The Hague, 1976
Arthur J. Knodel, Saint-John Perse: Lettres, Princeton, 1979
Edith Jonssen-Devillers, Cosmos and the Sacred in the Poetics of Octavio Paz and Saint-John Perse, San Diego, University of California, 1976
John M. Cocking, "The Migrant Muse: Saint-John Perse", Encounter, London, XLVI, March 1976
Elizabeth Jennings, "Saint-John Perse: the Worldly Seer", in Seven Men of Vision: an Appreciation, London, 1976
Roger Little, "A Letter About Conrad by Saint-John Perse", Conradiana, Lubbock, Texas, VIII, no. 3, Autumn 1976
Anonymous, "An Exile for Posterity", The Times Literary Supplement, London, no. 3860, 5 March 19761977Roger Little, "The Eye at the Center of Things", Times Literary Supplement, London, no. 3941, 7 October 1977
Roger Little, "Saint-John Perse and Joseph Conrad: Some Notes and an Uncollected Letter", Modern language Review, Cambridge, LXII, no. 4, October 1977
Roger Little, "The World and the Word in Saint-John Perse", in Sensibility and Creation: Essays in XXth Century French Poetry, London and New York, 1977
John D. Price, "Man, Women and the Problem of Suffering in Saint-John Perse", Modern Language Review, Cambridge, LXII, no. 3, July 19771978Reino Virtanen, "Between Saint-John and Persius: Saint-John Perse and Paul Valéry", Symposium, Summer 1978
Roger Little, "Saint-John Perse and Denis Devlin: A compagnonage", Irish University Review, Dublin, VIII, Autumn 19781979Roger Little, "Claudel and Saint-John Perse. The Convert and the Unconvertible", Claudel Studies, VI, 19791982Steven Winspur, "Saint-John Perse's Oiseaux: the Poem, the Painting and Beyond", L'Esprit Créateur, Columbia University, XXII, no. 4, Winter 19821983William Calin, "Saint-John Perse", in A Muse for Heroes: Nine Centuries of the Epic in France, University of Toronto Press, 1983
Steven Winspur, "The Poetic Significance of the Thing-in-itself", Sub-stance, no. 41, 1983
Joseph T. Krause, "The Visual Form of Saint-John Perse's Imagery", Aix-en-Provence, 1983
Peter Fell, "A Critical Study of Saint-John Perse's Chronique"  . MA dissertation, University of Manchester, 19831984Saint-John Perse: Documentary Exhibition and Works on the Poem Amers, Washington, 1984–19851985Erika Ostrovsky, Under the Sign of Ambiguity: Saint-John Perse/Alexis Leger, New York, 19851988Steven Winspur, Saint-John Perse and the Imaginary Reader, Geneva, 1988
Peter Baker, "Perse on Poetry", The Connecticut Review, Willimantic, XI, no. 1, 1988
Peter Baker, "Saint-John Perse, Alexis Leger, 1960", The Nobel Prize Winners: Literature, April 19881990Peter Baker, "Exile in Language", Studies in 20th century Literature, Manhattan (Kansas) and Lincoln (Nebraska), XIV, no. 2, Summer 1990
Erika Ostrovsky, "Saint-John Perse", The Twentieth Century, New York, 19901991Luigi Fiorenzato, Anabasis/Anabase: T. S. Eliot translates Saint-John Perse, Padova, 1991–1992
Peter Baker, "Metric, Naming and Exile: Perse, Pound, Genet", in The Scope of Words in Honor to Albert S. Cook, New York, 1991
Peter Baker, Obdurate Brilliance: Exteriority and the Modern Long Poem, University of Florida Press, 19911992Josef Krause, "The Two Axes of Saint-John Perse's Imagery", Studi Francesi, Torino, XXXVI, no. 106, 1992
Carol Rigolot, "Ancestors, Mentors and 'Grands Aînés': Saint-John Perse's Chronique", Literary Generations, Lexington, 19921994Richard L. Sterling, The Prose Works of Saint-John Perse. Towards an Understanding of His Poetry, New York, 19941996Richard A. York, "Saint-John Perse, the Diplomat", Claudel Studies, XXIII, 1–2, 19961997Judith Urian, The Biblical Context in Saint-John Perse's Work, Hebrew University of Jerusalem, 19971999Mary Gallagher, "Seminal Praise: The Poetry of Saint-John Perse", in An Introduction to Caribbean Francophone writing, Oxford, 1999
Carol Rigolot, "Saint-John Perse's Oiseaux: from Audubon to Braque and Beyond", in Resonant Themes: Literature, History and the Arts in XIXth and XXth Century Europe, Chapel Hill, North Carolina, 1999
Judith Urian, "Delicious Abyss: the Biblical Darkness in the Poetry of Saint-John Perse", Comparative literature studies, XXXVI, no. 3, 19992000Jeffrey Mehlman, Émigré New York. French Intellectuals in Wartime, Manhattan, 1940–1944, Baltimore and London, 2000
Zeyma Kamalick, In Defense of Poetry: T. S. Eliot's Translation of Anabase by Saint-John Perse, Princeton, 20002001Emmanuelle Hériard Dubreuil, Une certaine idée de la France: Alexis Leger's Views During the Occupation of France June 1940 – August 1944, London School of Economics, 2001
Pierre Lastenet, Saint-John Perse and the Sacred, University of London, 2001
Marie-Noëlle Little, The Poet and the Diplomat [Correspondence Saint-John Perse/Dag Hammarskjöld], Syracuse University Press, 2001
Marie-Noëlle Little, "Travellers in Two Worlds: Dag Hammarskjöld and Alexis Leger", in Development Dialogue, Uppsala, 20012002Carol Rigolot, Forged Genealogies: Saint-John Perse's Conversations with Culture, The University of North Carolina Press, 20022003Mary Gallagher, "Remembering Caribbean Childhoods, Saint-John Perse's Éloges and Patrick Chamoiseau's Antan d'enfance", in The Francophone Caribbean Today: Literature, Language, Culture, The University of West Indies Press, 20032004Colette Camelin, "Hermes and Aphrodite in Saint-John Perse's Winds and Seamarks", in Hermes and Aphrodite Encounters, Birmingham, 2004
Patrick Chamoiseau, "Excerpts Freely Adapted From Meditations for Saint-John Perse", Literature and Arts of the Americas, XXXVII, no. 12005Henriette Levillain, Saint-John Perse, Ministère des Affaires étrangères, Paris, 2005
Joseph Acquisto, "The Lyric of Narrative: Exile, Poetry and Story in Saint-John Perse and Elisabeth Bishop", Orbis Litterarum, no. 5, 2005
Xue Die, "Saint-John Perse's Palm Trees", American Letters and Commentary, no. 17, 2005
Valérie Loichot, "Saint-John Perse's Imagined Shelter: J'habiterai mon nom, in Discursive Geographies, Writing Space and Place in French, Amsterdam, 2005
Carol Rigolot, "Blood Brothers: Archibald MacLeish and Saint-John Perse", Archibald MacLeish Journal, Summer 2005
Carol Rigolot, "Saint-John Perse", in Transatlantic relations, France and the Americas, Culture, Politics, History, Oxford and Santa Barbara, 20052007'''
Valérie Loichot, Orphan Narratives: The Postplantation Literature of Faulkner, Glissant, Morrison and Saint-John Perse, University of Virginia Press, 2007
Harris Feinsod, "Reconsidering the 'Spiritual Economy': Saint-John Perse, His Translators and the Limits of Internationalism", "Benjamin, Poetry and Criticism", Telos, New York, no. 38, 2007
Peter Poiana, "The Order of Nemesis in Saint-John Perse's Vents", Neophilologus, vol. 91, no. 1, 2007
Jeffrey Meyers, "The Literary Politics of the Nobel Prize", Antioch Review'', vol. 65, no. 2, 2007

Notes

Books

External links
 Fondation Saint-John Perse, Aix-en-Provence, Website of the Aix-en-Provence Fondation about the poet and diplomat (in French)
 
 Saint-John Perse, le poète aux masques, site devoted to the author (in French)
 Liste de diffusion SJPinfo (news) devoted to Saint-John Perse

1887 births
1975 deaths
People from Pointe-à-Pitre
Nobel laureates in Literature
French Nobel laureates
French diplomats
French male poets
20th-century French poets